Senator Won Pat may refer to:

 Antonio Borja Won Pat (1908–1987), Senate of Guam
 Judith Won Pat (born 1949), Senate of Guam